Jwaladevi Temple  (ज्वालादेवी मन्दिर) is located in Shaktinagar which is in Sonbhadra district of Uttar Pradesh. The Jwaladevi temple is dedicated to Goddess Jwala Ji .
This is an age old Ashtagrih temple of Jwala Devi & one of the 51 Shaktipeethas of India. The old temple is believed to be 1000 years old. The old temple was constructed by Raja Udit Narayan Singh of Gaharwal village. The new temple has been built replacing the old one. Here the Front tongue of Devi Sati is worshipped. She is venerated as the kuldevi, family goddess, of Katoch Rajputs, Bhatia, Dhadwals and Meisuria people.

History
Mythology Recognize that because of ego Daksha Prajapati was not invited to the ritual Dewadidev Shiva by the humiliation of husband Sati to destroy the ego of the father abandoned her body. This angered Shiva. He   originated Veerbhadra from his coma and ordered the slaughter of Prajapati Daksha . Prajapati was killed by Veerbhadra.
After convincing the gods Shiva the Creator placed the severed head of the goat in place of head on the Prajapati.
Jwaladevi Temple is place that is believed to have been blessed with the presence of Shakti due to the falling of Front tongue of devi from the corpse of Sati Devi, when Lord Shiva carried her and wandered throughout Aryavarta in sorrow.

Importance
The Idol of the main deity is located in the Sanctum Sanctorum (central place of the temple). The old black stone idol which was in the old temple has been installed along with other deities surrounding the main idol. It is believed that people offer gold/silver tongue as offerings here after their wishes are fulfilled.

Attractions
The puja of the temple is being regularly performed by the priests whose family has been doing it for last 12 generations. Presently there are 12 priests involved in performing the routine puja at this temple. Jawalamukhi cave is located at a distance of 1 km from the temple. It is said that the cave had three openings earlier but presently the cave is filled with water of a spring and has only a single opening.

How to reach

By road 
Accessed by road from Robertsganj via Renukut- Shaktinagar road through SH-5 & NH-75, frequent bus service is available from Robertsganj and Varanasi.

By train 
Nearest railway station is Shaktinagar and Jwalamukhi Road which is well connected by rail to all the major cities of India.

By air 
 Babatpur Airport, Varanasi about 176 km.
Muirpur Airport, Myorpur, Renukut  about 45 km.

References

 http://www.easternuptourism.com/?p=6862

Shakti Peethas
Tourist attractions in Sonbhadra district
Hindu temples in Uttar Pradesh
Buildings and structures in Sonbhadra district